The Guangzhou Water Bus is the short distance ferry and medium to long distance passenger liner services of Guangzhou, China operated by Guangzhou Public Transport Group Liner Co., Ltd. The Water Bus services, succeeding the Bus, Taxi, and Metro, is the fourth public transport system in the city. As per January 2020, the Water Bus system has 12 routes, 35 piers and a fleet of 46 ships in operation.

History 
The city has a long established ferry service crossing the Pearl River. Medium to long distance passenger liner services, Water Bus, was introduced on 10 April 2007 following the trial operation of route S1 between Fangcun and Zhongda (Sun Yat-sen University). The journey was free during the three-day trial period, and attracted 36,483 passengers.

In September 2013, 7 additional routes (S2-S6, S11-S12) were opened, new destinations including Canton Tower, Jinshazhou, Changzhou were brought into the network.

In February 2014, all routes are air-conditioned. Ticket prices for short ferry services increased from ¥0.5 to ¥1, and for longer distance journeys cap at ¥5.

In late 2014, some routes were adjusted and merged, and new route was opened between Nanpu Island and Huangsha.

From May 2016, following the criticism of low passenger volume and continuous loss, Liner Company debuted the new on-demand services 'Ruyue'. Passengers can book journey mobile app. The service will only operate when there are sufficient bookings.

Routes

See also 
 List of ferries, wharfs and ports in Guangzhou

References

External links 
 

Transport in Guangzhou
2007 establishments in China
Water taxis